"The Trouble with Templeton" is episode 45 of the American television anthology series The Twilight Zone starring Brian Aherne, Pippa Scott and Sydney Pollack. The episode originally aired on December 9, 1960 on CBS.

Opening narration

Plot
Aging Broadway actor Booth Templeton is at home, watching his much-younger wife, Doris, flirting with a gigolo by the pool. Booth notes that he hasn't achieved any contentment with his wife and reminisces about the happiness he had with his first wife, Laura, who died after seven years of marriage. Booth leaves to attend the first rehearsal of his new play, where he learns the director has been replaced. The new director, Arthur Willis, shows no respect for the experienced Booth and questions his commitment to the play.

Pressured and desperately unhappy, Booth runs out the stage door and discovers he has been transported back 30 years to the early days of his career. A stagehand informs him that his wife, Laura, is waiting for him at the speakeasy around the corner. He finds her there, flirting with a much younger man, Barney. Laura is cavalier toward Booth, and in his frustration, he snatches a script Laura uses to fan herself and implores Laura to appreciate their life together. Laura rebuffs all Booth's attempts at conversation, laughing at him with Barney, and eventually she tells Booth to leave. As he does so, everyone in the speakeasy stops and looks on with slight sadness, the music stops, and the room grows dark.

Booth runs back into the theater and the present. He fans himself with Laura's script, and notices that it is for a play titled What to Do When Booth Comes Back. Booth realizes that ghosts from his past have been performing for him in order to force him out of his paralyzing nostalgia. Now content to live in the present, Booth returns to the rehearsal and commands the respect that is his due as a distinguished actor.

Closing narration

Cast
Brian Aherne as Booth Templeton
Pippa Scott as Laura Templeton
Sydney Pollack as Arthur Willis
Dave Willock as Marty
King Calder as Sid Sperry
Larry J. Blake as Freddie
David Thursby as Eddie
Charles S. Carlson as Barney Flueger

See also
 List of The Twilight Zone (1959 TV series) episodes

References

 DeVoe, Bill. (2008). Trivia from The Twilight Zone. Albany, GA: Bear Manor Media. 
 Grams, Martin. (2008). The Twilight Zone: Unlocking the Door to a Television Classic. Churchville, MD: OTR Publishing.

External links
 

The Twilight Zone (1959 TV series season 2) episodes
Television episodes about time travel
1960 American television episodes
Fiction set in 1927
Television episodes set in New York City